Pontinus nigropunctatus, the deepwater jack or St. Helena deepwater scorpionfish,  is a species of marine ray-finned fish belonging to the family Scorpaenidae, the scorpionfishes. It is found in the southern  Atlantic Ocean.

Taxonomy
Pontinus nigropunctatus was first formally described as Sebastes nigropunctatus by the German-born British ichthyologist Albert Günther with St Helena given as the type locality. The specific name nigropunctatus means “black spotted”, an allusion to the many dusky spots on its reddish body.

Description
Pontinus nigropunctatus has a reddish-rose coloured body with the upper body being marked with numerous blackish-brown spots.

Distribution and habitat
Pontinus nigropunctatus was thought to be a species which was endemic to St Helena but it has also been found at the Bonaparte Seamount, the Grattan Seamount, Ascension Island, and the Saint Peter and Saint Paul Archipelago of Brazil.

Biology
Pontinus nigropunctatus has been found to have a sex ration of 1.8 males for each female. The females carried an average of 49,544 oocytes, with the larger fishes have a greater number of oocytes. The deepwater jack may develop its oocytes asynchronously.

Fisheries
Pontinus nigropunctatus is not a frequent quarry for fishermen despite its palatable, soft white flesh.

Conservation status
Pontinus nigropunctatus wasassessed by the IUCN as Vulnerable in 1996 , the assessment was based on its restricted range as it was understood to be endmeic to St Helena, later diiscovery of its wider distribution has led to its status changing to Least Concern.

References

nigropunctatus
Fauna of Saint Helena Island
Fish described in 1868
Taxa named by Albert Günther
Taxonomy articles created by Polbot